Night Mail (Chinese: 死亡邮件) is a 2014 Chinese crime suspense thriller film directed by Li Yu. It was released on 20 June 2014.

Cast
Ren Quan
Qiao Renliang
Zhang Yangguoer
Li Yu
Jessie Zhou
Cao Yang
Bai Yao

Reception
The film has grossed $0.95 million in China.

References

2014 crime thriller films
Chinese crime thriller films
Chinese suspense films
2010s Mandarin-language films